Atlanta's John Marshall Law School (AJMLS) is a private for-profit law school in Atlanta, Georgia. It was founded in 1933 and named for John Marshall, the fourth chief justice of the Supreme Court of the United States. AJMLS is accredited by the American Bar Association.

History 
AJMLS was founded in 1933 in Atlanta and was among the first southern law schools to integrate. It did not receive American Bar Association (ABA) approval until 2005.  In October 2017, the ABA concluded that the Law School is not in compliance with ABA Standards 301(a), 309(b), and 501(a)/501(b), and in December 2018, the ABA placed the school on probation for "substantial" and "persistent" non-compliance with those standards. At its November 2019 meeting, the Council removed the Law School from probation and Atlanta's John Marshall Law School remains an approved law school. On May 15, 2020, the council of the American Bar Association's Section of Legal Education and Admissions to the Bar met remotely and determined this school and nine others had significant noncompliance with Standard 316.  This Standard was revised in 2019 to provide that at least 75% of an accredited law school's graduates who took a bar exam must pass one within two years of graduation.  The school was asked to submit a report by Feb. 1, 2021; and, if the council did not find the report demonstrated compliance, the school would be asked to appear before the council at its May, 2021 meeting.  On February 26, 2021, the ABA's council posted that the school was now in compliance with the standard.

In late 2011, AJMLS opened a branch campus in Savannah, Georgia, named Savannah Law School. In March 2018, the Law School announced its branch campus in Savannah was no longer accepting applications for 2018 and offered its current students options to continue their legal education in Savannah, initiate an intra-campus transfer to the main campus in Atlanta, or seek to transfer or visit at a different institution.  A class action suit on behalf of Savannah Law School students claims that the Savannah school is being closed to benefit the parent school in Atlanta.

In 2017, AJMLS received attention when an alleged student was said to be a white nationalist organizer who sent a lynching threat to a Black activist in Atlanta.

Campus

After selling its Midtown Atlanta building in 2020, the Law School relocated to Peachtree Center in Downtown Atlanta. After a multi-floor construction project, the Law School took possession of its new campus on August 6, 2021. It is now housed in One Marquis Tower and comprises almost 60,000 square feet of classroom and office space, including a law library and courtroom. The construction project was completed in less than 24 weeks.

Academics
AJMLS is accredited by the American Bar Association. AJMLS offers five J.D. programs: full-time day, part-time day, part-time evening, accelerated/spring start, and a Criminal Justice Certificate Program (led by MacArthur Genius Fellow, Jonathan Rapping). The Certificate Program had previously been offered as the Criminal Justice Honors Program from 2011 to 2018. AJMLS students may apply to co-enroll in the Certificate Program after successful completion of their first year curriculum.

Experiential learning
The experiential learning program at AJMLS combines classroom theory with direct experience by offering students firsthand exposure to the practice of law. The for-credit program consists of legal clinics, intensive externships, and other approved field placements.

Some placements involve criminal prosecution litigation and eligible students may apply for a Prosecuting Attorneys’ Council Third Year Practice Certificate under Georgia's Third-Year Practice Act.

Student organizations
Students attending AJMLS may take part in many independent student organizations. These groups cover such interests as cultural diversity, academics, recreation, and professional and networking opportunities.

Student Organizations for the 2018-2019 Academic Year: Black Law Students Association (BLSA), Christian Legal Society, Corporate and Business Law Society, Criminal Law Society, Family Law Society, OUTLaws And Allies, Georgia Association of Women Lawyers (GAWL), Health Law Society, Law Journal, National Lawyers Guild, Phi Alpha Delta, Sports and Entertainment Law Society, SOLO Practitioners' Law Society, Student Bar Association.

Notable alumni 
Neal Boortz
Jon G. Burns
Doug Collins
Femi Gbajabiamila
Ronald Ramsey, Sr.

Notable faculty 

Jonathan Rapping

Employment 
As of April 11, 2018, the ABA Employment Statistics total employment rate for 2017 graduates is 71.11% with 43.7% obtaining employment where bar passage is required. According to the report, 15 graduates are listed as employment status unknown, 96 are known to be employed in some capacity (combined attorney and non-attorney employment, with 54 employed full-time where bar passage is required), two are pursuing a graduate degree full-time, one is listed as unemployed with their start date deferred, 20 are unemployed and seeking employment, and one who is unemployed and not seeking employment.

Costs
The total cost of attendance (indicating the cost of tuition, fees, and living expenses) at John Marshall for the 2017–2018 academic year is $70,304. The Law School Transparency estimated debt-financed cost of attendance for three years is $256,530.

See also 

 List of colleges and universities in metropolitan Atlanta

References

External links
Official website

Law schools in Georgia (U.S. state)
Midtown Atlanta
Universities and colleges in Atlanta
Independent law schools in the United States
Educational institutions established in 1933
1933 establishments in Georgia (U.S. state)
Private universities and colleges in Georgia (U.S. state)